Puerto Rico celebrates all official U.S. holidays, and a number of other official holidays established by the Commonwealth government. 
Additionally, many municipalities celebrate their own Patron Saint Festivals (fiestas patronales in Spanish), as well as festivals honoring cultural icons like bomba y plena, danza, salsa, hamacas (hammocks), and popular crops such as plantains and coffee.

Until June 30, 2014, there were 19 public holidays in Puerto Rico. As a result of a new Commonwealth law, after July 1, 2014, the Commonwealth government consolidated three of its former holidays (Luis Muñoz Rivera, José Celso Barbosa, and Luis Muñoz Marín) into just one called Día de los Próceres Puertorriqueños (The Day of Illustrious Puerto Ricans), and reducing the number of holidays observed publicly to 17. As part of the new law, the third Monday of February became Día de los Próceres Puertorriqueños when, in addition to commemorating the birth of those three illustrious Puerto Ricans will also include commemorating the birthdays of four other illustrious Puerto Ricans – Ramón Emeterio Betances, Román Baldorioty de Castro, Ernesto Ramos Antonini and Luis A. Ferré. The law mandated that the Eugenio María de Hostos holiday and the José de Diego holiday would continue to be observed on their respective days as usual.

Official public holidays
Official public holidays are those recognized by the Commonwealth of Puerto Rico government. All public offices must close. Many businesses also elect to close. These public holidays include both federal and commonwealth-established holidays, since Puerto Rico recognizes all U.S. federal holidays.

Religious holidays

References

External links

 Official Government Holidays for 2010. Gobierno.pr (Spanish)

 
Holidays